Potosi Peak is a  mountain summit located in Ouray County of Colorado, United States. It is situated five miles southwest of the community of Ouray, on land managed by Uncompahgre National Forest. It is part of the Sneffels Range which is a subset of the San Juan Mountains, which in turn is part of the Rocky Mountains. It is situated west of the Continental Divide, 2.2 miles south of Whitehouse Mountain, and 2.5 miles southeast of Mount Sneffels. Potosi ranks as the 113th-highest peak in Colorado, and the fourth-highest in the Sneffels Range. Recreation enthusiasts heading for Yankee Boy Basin traverse below the southern base of the mountain. The mining activity in the immediate area produced significant amounts of gold and silver. "Potosi" in Quechuan language translates to "great wealth.". The mountain's name, which has been officially adopted by the United States Board on Geographic Names, was in use before 1899 when Henry Gannett published it in A Dictionary of Altitudes in the United States.

Climate 
According to the Köppen climate classification system, Potosi Peak is located in an alpine subarctic climate zone with long, cold, snowy winters, and cool to warm summers. Due to its altitude, it receives precipitation all year, as snow in winter, and as thunderstorms in summer, with a dry period in late spring. Precipitation runoff from the mountain drains into tributaries of the Uncompahgre River.

Gallery

See also

References

External links 

 Weather forecast: Potosi Peak

Mountains of Ouray County, Colorado
San Juan Mountains (Colorado)
Mountains of Colorado
North American 4000 m summits
Uncompahgre National Forest